SN 1986G was a supernova that was observed on May 3, 1986 by Robert Evans.  Its host galaxy, Centaurus A, is about 15 million light-years away in the constellation Centaurus. Since Centaurus A is about 15 million light-years away from us, this supernova happened 15 million years ago.

SN 1986G was a bright blue-green star in the middle of the left part of the dust belt of Centaurus A. The blue-green color occurs because David Malin could take the red plate used in this composite image only one year after the supernova occurred, and it had faded away at that time.

See also
Centaurus A

External links
Light curves and spectra on the Open Supernova Catalog
Radio Observations of the Type Ia SN 1986G and Constraints on the Symbiotic-Star Progenitor Scenario

Centaurus (constellation)
Supernovae
Astronomical objects discovered in 1986